Orville Buchner (born January 17, 1936) was a professional American Welterweight boxer from Miami Beach, Florida. Buchner was born in La Crosse, Wisconsin, and fought in the Golden Gloves in La Crosse. He then joined the United States Army and gained more amateur boxing experience. After being discharged from the Army Buchner attended State College of Wisconsin where he majored in economics.

Buchner moved from Wisconsin to Miami Beach, Florida, to pursue a professional boxing career. On August 7, 1961, Buckner turned professional and boxed a four-round draw with Dave Gaitor at the Sir John Club in Miami, Florida. One month later, Buchner knocked out Dave Gaitor in two rounds. After boxing a four-round draw with tough Hilton Lumpkin, Buchner reeled off four straight wins.

On April 19, 1962, Buchner lost his first professional fight by four-round decision to Hollywood, Florida's Ray Lavarro at the Little River Auditorium in Miami, Florida. On August 23, 1962, at the Little River Auditorium, Buchner scored a five-round technical knockout win over Hilton Lumpkin.

At Miami on October 4, 1962, Buchner surprised the South Florida boxing community by boxing a four-round draw with veteran boxer Duane Simpson.

Buchner was a boxer without a spectacular punch that relied on his boxing skills. He had much heart and determination. Buchner worked as a hotel auditor on Miami Beach during his boxing career.

Buchner's unofficial professional record was eleven wins four losses and four draws.

References

1939 births
Living people
Boxers from Wisconsin
Sportspeople from La Crosse, Wisconsin
United States Army soldiers
American male boxers
Welterweight boxers